Antje Zöllkau (née Kempe, born 22 June 1963) is a German former javelin thrower who represented East Germany. The 1982 European silver medallist, her best javelin throw of 72.16 metres in 1984, ranks her in the world all-time top 10 for the Pre-1999 old model javelin.

Career
Born Antje Kempe in Saalfeld, Thuringia, she won the silver medals at the 1981 European Junior Championships and the 1982 European Championships. She then competed at the 1983 World Championships, finishing eleventh. She won the GDR Championship title in 1983 with a throw of 68.42 metres.

Her personal best throw was 72.16 metres with the old javelin type, achieved in May 1984 in Celje. This ranks her second among German javelin throwers, only behind Petra Felke (who held the world record with the old javelin type).

International competitions
All results regarding javelin throw

References

1963 births
Living people
People from Saalfeld
Sportspeople from Thuringia
East German female javelin throwers
German female javelin throwers
European Athletics Championships medalists
World Athletics Championships athletes for East Germany